The 1996 Asian PGA Tour, titled as the 1996 Omega Tour for sponsorship reasons, was the second season of the Asian PGA Tour, the second men's professional golf tour in Asia (outside of Japan) alongside the long established Asia Golf Circuit.

Schedule
The following table lists official events during the 1996 season.

Order of Merit
The Order of Merit was based on prize money won during the season, calculated in U.S. dollars.

Notes

References

Asian PGA Tour
Asian Tour